Beryl Markham (née Clutterbuck; 26 October 1902 – 3 August 1986) was a Kenyan aviator born in England (one of the first bush pilots), adventurer, racehorse trainer and author. She was the first person to fly solo, non-stop across the Atlantic from Britain to North America. She wrote about her adventures in her memoir, West with the Night.

Early years
Markham was born in the village of Ashwell, in the county of Rutland, England, the daughter of Charles Baldwin Clutterbuck, a horse trainer, and Clara Agnes (née Alexander) (1878–1952). She had an older brother, Richard Alexander "Dickie" Clutterbuck (1900–1927).

When she was four years old, she moved with her father to Kenya, which was then colonial British East Africa. He built a horse racing farm in Njoro, near the Great Rift Valley between the Mau Escarpment and the Rongai Valley. Markham spent an adventurous childhood learning, playing, and hunting with the local children. On her family's farm, she developed her knowledge of and love for horses, establishing herself as a trainer at the age of 17, after her father left for Peru.
 
Markham was regarded as a non-conformist. She was married three times, taking the name Markham from her second husband, the wealthy Mansfield Markham, with whom she had a son, Gervase. 

In 1928, while pregnant with Gervase, she entered into an affair with Prince Henry, Duke of Gloucester - known as Prince Harry - the son of George V, who became besotted with her during his trip to Kenya. It is said that Beryl also simulaneously had an affair with Harry's older brother, Edward, the Prince of Wales - and later Edward VIII - during this time. Returning to England, Harry installed Beryl as his mistress in the Grovesnor Hotel, a few minutes walk from his hotel in Buckingham Palace. George V attempted to end the affair by sending Harry on a royal visit to Japan, though the affair resumed on his return to England. Historian Jane Ridley notes that Beryl 'was spotted running barefoot along the corridors of Buckingham Palace'. Mansfield later threatened to divorce Beryl and cite Harry as a co-respondent. Though Mansfield and his brother Charles were vociferously warned against 'citing a prince of the blood in a divorce petition' by Queen Mary, the Palace agreed to pay up in the face of the brother's blackmail attempts. £15,000 was placed in a trust fund, providing Beryl with an annuity of £500 (around £32,000 in 2021).

Beryl also had an affair with Hubert Broad, who was later named by Mansfield Markham as a co-respondent in his 1937 divorce from Markham. After her Atlantic crossing, she returned to be with Broad, who was also an influence in her flying career.

She befriended the Danish writer Karen Blixen during the years that Blixen was managing her family's coffee farm in the Ngong hills outside Nairobi. When Blixen's romantic connection with the hunter and pilot Denys Finch Hatton was winding down, Markham started her own affair with him. He invited her to tour game lands on what turned out to be his fatal flight, but Markham supposedly declined because of a premonition of her flight instructor, British pilot Tom Campbell Black.

Inspired and coached by Tom Campbell Black, Markham learned to fly. She worked for some time as a bush pilot, spotting game animals from the air and signaling their locations to safaris on the ground.

Record flight 

In 1936, Markham made a solo flight across the Atlantic, from England to North America.  When she decided to take on the Atlantic crossing, no pilot had yet flown non-stop from Europe to New York. On 4 September 1936, she took off from Abingdon, southern England. After a 20-hour flight, her Vega Gull, The Messenger, suffered fuel starvation due to icing of the fuel tank vents, and she crash-landed at Baleine Cove on Cape Breton Island, Nova Scotia, Canada. She became the first person to make it from England to North America non-stop from east to west and was celebrated as an aviation pioneer.

Markham chronicled many of her adventures in her memoir, West with the Night, published in 1942. Despite strong reviews in the press, the book sold modestly, and then quickly went out of print. After living for many years in the United States, Markham moved back to Kenya in 1952.

Rediscovery 
Markham's memoir lingered in obscurity until 1982, when California restaurateur George Gutekunst read a collection of Ernest Hemingway's letters, including one in which Hemingway praised Markham's writing: 

Intrigued, Gutekunst read West with the Night and became so enamored of Markham's prose that he helped persuade a California publisher, North Point Press, to re-issue the book in 1983. The re-release of the book led to praise for the 80-year-old Markham as a great author as well as flyer.

When found in Kenya by AP East Africa correspondent Barry Shlachter, Markham was living in poverty. She had recently been badly beaten during a burglary at her house near the Nairobi racetrack, where she still trained thoroughbreds. The success of the re-issue of West with the Night provided enough income for Markham to finish her life in relative comfort. Earlier, she had been supported by a circle of friends and owners of race horses she trained into her 80s. The book became a best-seller, spurred by the 1986 broadcast of a public television documentary about Markham's life, World Without Walls: Beryl Markham's African Memoir, produced by Gutekunst, Shlachter, Joan Saffa, Stephen Talbot and Judy Flannery in collaboration with KQED-TV in San Francisco. Gutekunst and Shlachter had approached the station to co-operate on the documentary, directed by Andrew Maxwell-Hyslop. British actress Diana Quick was the voice of Markham in readings from her memoir and Shlachter conducted the interviews. CNN Africa correspondent Gary Streiker did the filming for the well-reviewed, award-winning PBS program.

Markham died in Nairobi in 1986. Her short stories were posthumously collected in The Splendid Outcast, with an introduction by Mary S. Lovell. A tale from West with the Night was excerpted and illustrated by Don Brown as a children's book, The Good Lion. In 1988, CBS aired the biographical miniseries, Beryl Markham: A Shadow on the Sun, with Stefanie Powers in the title role.

Both West with the Night and Splendid Outcast appeared on the New York Times best-seller list of hardcover fiction.

Authorship controversy 
Critics raised questions as to whether Markham was the true, or sole author of West with the Night, when her third husband Raoul C Schumacher made claims to the book. Evidence abounds that she was indeed the sole author; copies of the manuscripts sent to her editor prior to Markham meeting her ex-husband quickly silenced the critics and his claims. Schumacher was lodging with Hollywood writer Allen Vincent in California according to the 1940 census and Markham re-entered the United States via Florida in 1941. It is unlikely that Schumacher would have had time to process such a detailed biography in such a short time, but may have suggested it might make a Hollywood film to encourage Markham to marry him.

Author Mary S. Lovell visited Markham in Nairobi and interviewed her extensively shortly before Markham's death, in preparation for her biography, Straight on Till Morning (1987). From her research, Lovell concluded that Markham was the sole author, although Schumacher made some basic edits to the manuscript. Instead, Lovell suggests Antoine de Saint Exupéry, another of Markham's lovers, may have served as inspiration for Markham's clear, elegant language and storytelling style.

In popular culture
 In the film adaptation of Blixen's memoir, Out of Africa (1985), Markham is represented as an outspoken, horse-riding tomboy named Felicity (played by Suzanna Hamilton).
 1986, a United States public television documentary about Markham's life, World Without Walls: Beryl Markham's African Memoir, was produced by Gutekunst, Shlachter, Joan Saffa, Stephen Talbot and Judy Flannery in collaboration with KQED-TV.
 Stefanie Powers portrayed her in a made-for-TV film called Beryl Markham: A Shadow on the Sun in 1988.
 In the BBC-TV series, Heat of the Sun (1998), set in 1930s Kenya, the character of Emma Fitzgerald, an independent aviator played by Susannah Harker, appears to be modelled after Markham.
 A novel written by Paula McLain about Markham's life, Circling the Sun, was released in 2015.
 Represented as an aviation pioneer in the TV episode ‘Written Like a Merriwick’ from the Hallmark Channel TV Series, Good Witch (2015).

Legacy and honors
The International Astronomical Union has named the impact crater Markham, on the planet Venus, after her.

References

Bibliography
 Markham, Beryl. West with the Night. San Francisco: North Point Press, 1983 [1942]. .
 Lovell, Mary S. Straight on Till Morning: The Biography of Beryl Markham New York: St Martins Press, 1987. 
 Shlachter, Barry, "A Life of Adventure Rediscovered: Beryl Markham's 1942 Book, Lauded by Hemingway, Reprinted," The Associated Press, carried by "International Herald Tribune," Paris, 16 June 1983.
 Trzebinski, Errol. The Lives of Beryl Markham. New York: W.W. Norton. 1993. .
 Wheeler, Sara. Too Close to the Sun: The Audacious Life and Times of Denys Finch Hatton. New York: Random House. 2006. .

See also
Bror von Blixen-Finecke
Denys Finch Hatton

External links 
 "Beryl Markham" page at www.karenblixen.com.
 New York Times review of World Without Walls: Beryl Markham's African Memoir (1986)
 New York Times review of Beryl Markham: A Shadow on the Sun
 
 Biographer Mary S. Lovell's page for The Splendid Outcast
 Kirkpatrick Family archives group sheet for Butterwick line at http://genealogy.kirkpatrickaustralian.com/archives/familygroup.php?familyID=F7266&tree=TKA 

1902 births
1986 deaths
British aviation pioneers
People from Ashwell, Rutland
British emigrants to Kenya
British memoirists
British racehorse trainers
White Kenyan people
Kenyan writers
Kenyan women writers
British women aviators
British aviation record holders
British women memoirists
British women aviation record holders
Markham family
20th-century memoirists